Alfred William Hunt  (15 November 1830 – 3 May 1896), was a British painter. He was son of the landscapist Andrew Hunt.

Biography
Hunt was born in Liverpool in 1830. He began to paint while at the Liverpool Collegiate School. However at his father's suggestion he went in 1848 to Corpus Christi College, Oxford to study classics. His career there was distinguished; he won the Newdigate Prize in 1851 for his poem Nineveh, and became a Fellow of Corpus in 1853.

Hunt throughout his career provided sketches to The Illustrated London News the first such, came about through being a witness of the Dee Bridge train disaster on 24 May 1847. Hunt, aged 16 at the time was in the following train, his sketch of the incident was printed by the newspaper on 29 May 1847.

He did not, however, abandon his artistic practice for, encouraged by Ruskin, he exhibited at the Royal Academy in 1854, and afterwards contributed landscapes in oil and water-colour to London and other provincial exhibitions. In 1861 he married, gave up his Fellowship, and in 1862 was elected as an Associate of the Old Water-Colour Society, receiving full membership in 1864. His work is distinguished mainly by its exquisite quality and a poetic rendering of atmosphere.  He was associated with the Pre-Raphaelite Brotherhood, and the extraordinary detail apparent in his landscapes and the careful rendering of grass, leaves and trees is a consequence of this.

His wife Margaret Raine Hunt wrote several works of fiction; and one of her daughters, Violet Hunt, was known as a novelist. His niece, Jessie MacGregor has paintings in the Walker Art Gallery  in Liverpool.

He is buried with his wife and daughter at Brookwood Cemetery.

References

 Allen Staley, The Pre-Raphaelite Landscape, 1973.

External links

1830 births
1896 deaths
19th-century English painters
English male painters
Landscape artists
Artists from Liverpool
English watercolourists
Burials at Brookwood Cemetery
19th-century English male artists